Lenox Community School District is a rural public school district headquartered in Lenox, Iowa.

It includes portions of Adams, Ringgold, Taylor, and Union counties. Communities in its area include Lenox, Clearfield, and Sharpsburg.

History
The district began operations in 1878. The district has a single school building at 600 S. Locust St., built in 1968. The elementary school previously had a separate building at 301 W. Michigan Street, but in 2005 moved into 600 S. Locust.

In 1913. Lenox schools published their first school song, "Black and gold" 

In 1968, the school was separated from K-12 to an elementary school and high school.

When the Clearfield Community School District closed in 2014, the Lenox district absorbed a portion of it.

Schools
 Lenox Elementary School
 Lenox High School

Lenox High School

Athletics
The Tigers compete in the Pride of Iowa Conference in the following sports:

 Football
 2008 8-player class State Champions
 Volleyball
 Cross Country
 Basketball
 Wrestling
 Bowling
 Golf
 Track and Field
 Baseball
 2006 Class 1A State Champions 
 Softball

See also
List of school districts in Iowa
List of high schools in Iowa

References

External links
 Lenox Community School District
 

School districts in Iowa
Education in Adams County, Iowa
Education in Ringgold County, Iowa
Education in Taylor County, Iowa
Education in Union County, Iowa
School districts established in 1878
1878 establishments in Iowa